This is a List of San Diego Historic Landmarks in the Point Loma and Ocean Beach areas.   The Point Loma and Ocean Beach neighborhoods are located in the central coastal region of the City of San Diego, in southwestern San Diego County, California.

Introduction
In 1967, the City of San Diego established a Historical Resources Board with the authority to protect buildings and other structures as historical landmarks.  In total, the city has designated more than 850 structures or other properties as designated historic landmarks. This list includes details on more than 50 San Diego Historic Landmarks located in the Point Loma Peninsula and Ocean Beach areas.

Many of the properties have also received recognition at the federal level by inclusion on the National Register of Historic Places or by designation as National Historic Landmarks.

Listing of the San Diego Historic Landmarks on the Point Loma Peninsula

See also

 List of San Diego Historic Landmarks — all.
 List of San Diego Historic Landmarks in La Jolla
 List of California Historical Landmarks in San Diego County, California

References

External links
 Sandiego.gov: official Historical Landmarks Designated by the San Diego Historical Resources Board

Point Loma
 Point Loma
.
.
Point Loma
San Diego, Point Loma